The church of St Laurence, Upminster, is the Church of England parish church in Upminster, England. It is a Grade I listed building. It is the historic minster or church from which Upminster derives its name, meaning 'upper church', probably signifying 'church on higher ground'. The place-name is first attested as 'Upmynster' in 1062, and appears as 'Upmunstra' in the Domesday Book of 1086.

History
Alice Perrers, mistress of King Edward III, was buried in the church or churchyard in 1400. There is no memorial to mark her grave. She had three illegitimate children by the king, and later lived and died in the manor of Gaynes in Upminster.

The tower of St Laurence's was instrumental in the first accurate measurement of the speed of sound by Rev William Derham, who was also buried in the church or churchyard and who also, by his own wish, has no memorial.

Description
The church is a good example of 13th-century construction. The tower dates from this period, and is rubble-walled, with buttresses at the foot, and a leaded and shingled spire, typical of Essex.

The church was largely rebuilt in 1862–1863 by W. Gibbs Bartleet. Further rebuilding took place in 1928, when the original chancel became part of the nave, and the new choir and sanctuary were built, by Sir Charles Nicholson. Nicholson also built the current south chapel and Lady Chapel, on the north side.

The pulpit is by Violet Pinwill of Devon. The baptismal font is 15th-century, and came from Upminster Hill Chapel. The monuments include those of the Branfills of Upminster Hall, and the Esdailes of Gaynes.

The churchyard contains war graves of six service personnel of World War II.

References

Upminster
Church of England church buildings in the London Borough of Havering
13th-century church buildings in England
Grade I listed churches in London
History of the London Borough of Havering